The 1956/57 NTFL season was the 36th season of the Northern Territory Football League (NTFL).

Nightcliff have won there 1st premiership title while defeating the Buffaloes in the grand final by 27 points.

Grand Final

References 

Northern Territory Football League seasons
NTFL